Kannur, India has a number of tourist attractions including beaches, hills, temples and other monuments.

Beaches

Kannur has several beaches, some are:

Muzhappilangad Drive-in Beach: is Kerala's only drive-in beach, situated about 5 km north of Thalassery and 15 km from Kannur. There is an unpaved road winding through coconut groves, leading to the beach. The beach is about 5 kilometres long and curves in a wide area providing a good view of Kannur beach on the north. To the South and about 200 metres away from the beach there is an island called the "Green Island" which adds to the allure of the beach. And another important point is that there are home stays and beach resort available in Muzhappilangad drive in Beach such as corniche Beach Resort, palm resort, sun villa and samudra and in all resorts you could get fresh home made food which are prepared from homes on orders they get from the visitors you can get Kerala style food Kannur and thalassery special food and you could get homely atmosphere. 
Another important point is that you could get fresh air from the sea without smoke are good for old people and people who have health problems. 
Payyambalam Beach: It is the beach of the Kannur city. It has an unbroken coastline of a few kilometres. From the beach, one can see ships in transit along the Malabar Coast, that is, beyond Kozhikode and moving towards Mangalore, Goa and Mumbai. The well laid out garden and the massive landscaped sculpture of mother and child erected by noted sculptor Kanayi Kunhiraman makes it extremely captivating.
Baby Beach: It is so called as it is smaller than its bigger neighbourhood, Payyambalam Beach. The St. Angelo Fort is adjacent.
Meenkunnu Beach: Situated at Azhikode, it is 10 kilometres from the Kannur city. This beach has Meenkunnu cliff where the view of Ezhimala hills can be seen and Meenkunnu view point over the small hill where the view of entire Payyambalam beach can be seen.
Mappila Bay: Situated near the St. Angelo's Fort, the Mopila bay has a historical background. Centuries ago, it was the seat of Kolathiri Kings. The Kadalayi Fort and Sree Krishna Temple were quite famous. The remnants of the fort and the temple are still seen in Mopila Bay. A fishing harbour, built with Indo-Norwegian Project assistance, can be seen at this bay.
Chal Beach: 11 km from Kannur city, is a beach in Kerala. A Beach park is also available for visitors there.
Kizhunna Ezhara Beach: 11 km from Kannur, is one of the most secluded beaches in Kerala.
Chootad Beach: 27 km from Kannur city and 4.6 km from Pazhayangadi town. It is one of the cleanest beach of Kannur. The Beach park and Ezhimala view point are located at this beach.
Palliyamoola Beach: 5.2 km from Kannur city. It is one of the cleanest secluded beach located in the Kannur district. Several beach resorts are there in this beach for the tourists.
Dharmadam Island: (100 metres away from the mainland at Dharmadam): The small 5 acre (20,000 m2) island covered with coconut palms and dense bushes is visible from the Muzhappilangad beach. During low tide, one can walk to the island from the beach. It is surrounded by rivers and seas. Permission is required to enter this privately owned island. Dharmadam, earlier known as Dharmapattanam, was a Buddhist stronghold.

Snake Park

Snake Park is a landmark in the district of Snake Park at Parassinikkadavu, en route from Kannur to Taliparamba,  from National Highway (NH) 17. Here there are a large genre of snakes and other small animals as well as a live show, where trained personnel play and 'interact' with a variety of snakes, including cobras and vipers, and seek to quell mythical fears and superstitions about snakes. The Snake Park was set up by the Visha Chikista Kendra at Pappinisseri and has become a centre of attraction to both foreign and domestic tourists. This Kendra (center) offers effective treatment for snake bites with almost 100% cure. This is the only place, perhaps where Ayurveda and Allopathy are effectively combined for curing snake bites. The snake park houses about 150 varieties of snakes including the Spectacled Cobra, King Cobra, Russell's viper, Krait and various pit vipers. There is also a large collection of non-poisonous snakes including Pythons. A research laboratory to extract venom from snakes is proposed for the location. The park is dedicated to the preservation and conservation of snakes, many species of which are facing gradual extinction. Parassinikkadavu is noted for the Muthappan temple. This is the only temple in Kerala where a Theyyam performance is a daily ritual offering.

Forts

St. Angelo Fort

This fort witnessed several wars for its control until the British flag finally flew over it in 1790. Even now, it is in a fairly good state of preservation, and is a protected monument under Archaeological Survey of India (ASI). A painting of this fort and the fishing ferry behind the fort can be seen in the Rijksmuseum in Amsterdam.

St Angelo Fort is an important historical monument and tourist centre. Kerala Police has posted six Tourism Police Officers for the protection and guidance of tourists. Among them, Sathyan Eddakkad has detailed knowledge about this fort and the surrounding places. He wrote and published a book in Malayalam named Vasco Da Gaamyum charithrathile kaanaappurangalum (Vasco Da Gama and the unknown pages of history) in which he describes the past and present of the Fort.

The fort, though not as large as the well known Bekal Fort in Kasaragod, boasts lush greenery and well maintained surroundings.  The Payyambalam and Government guest house are some of the other landmarks near the fort.

Tellicherry Fort
Tellicherry Fort is in Thalassery (Tellicherry) a town. Tellicherry was one of the most important European trading centers of Kerala. In the 17th century the British opened a factory north of Tellicherry. Later they obtained a site from Vadakkelamkur, the de facto ruler of Kolathunad and established a factory at Tellicherry in 1708.

Paithalmala

Paithalmala is a hill station on the Kerala-Karnataka border and is 65 km north of Kannur. Ideal for trekking; it is around 1,371.6 metres above sea level. A base reception centre and a watchtower atop the cliff function for the benefit of tourists and trekkers. It is near to Kudianmala.

Ezhimala

Ezhimala, the capital of the ancient Mooshika kings, is considered to be an ancient historical site. It is a conspicuous, isolated cluster of hills,  forming a promontory, 38 km north of Kannur town. A flourishing sea port and centre of trade in ancient Kerala, it was one of the major battle fields of the Chola-Chera war of the 11th century. It is believed that Buddha had visited Ezhimala. An old mosque, believed to contain the mortal remains of Shaikh Abdul Latif, a Muslim reformist, is also located here. The hill is noted for rare medicinal herbs. There is an old tower of great antiquity here, the Mount Deli Light House. It is maintained by the Indian Navy and is a restricted area. The beach sand is of a different texture and the sea is bluer than in other areas. At Ettikulam bay, one can enjoy watching dolphins. Bordered by sea on three sides, Ezhimala is set to occupy a prominent place in the Naval history of the country, subsequent to the proposal for commissioning the Indian Naval Academy there.

Madayipara

Madayipara is significant owing to its biodiversity as well as history. Madayipara was the administrative center of the Ezhimala kings. In and around Madayipara, one can find remnants from the past. At the southern side of the hill, stand the remains of a fort called Pazhi Kotta (kotta means fort in Malayalam). Here one can also find watchtowers at the four corners of the fort. Between AD 14 and AD 18, Madayipara used to be the site for the coronation ceremony of the rulers of the princely state of Kolathunadu.

The hillock of Madayipara, which carries several signs of historic relevance, is also a place important from a religious point of view. Here, a pond in the shape of a hand held mirror, connected to ancient Jewish settlers, is another historic attraction. Similarly, a temple at this site, called Vadukunda Siva Temple, and the adjoining lake, about an acre in extent, form another attraction. The lake near the temple will not go dry even in hot summer months and remains a source of nourishment to life forms. The pooram festival of Madayi Kavu (kavu – family temples and those in the midst of thick vegetation) held at Madayipara has been responsible for much of its fame.

With regard to the biodiversity of Madayipara, the region contains about 300 flowering plants, about 30 varieties of grass, and several insect-eating plant species. Madayipara is also home to several rare medicinal herbs. Coming to avian life, Madayipara sustains about 100 species of butterflies and about 150 species of birds. Among the biggest butterflies in the world, the Atlas butterfly is a visitor to Madayipara.

V-Pra Kaayal Floating Park 

Vayalapra Kaayal Floating Park known as V-Pra Park is inaugurated on 5 June 2016. It is situated in Vayalapra lake near Madayi.

District Agricultural Farm, Taliparamba

Established in 1905, District Agricultural Farm, Kannur is one of the oldest farms in South India. Located at Taliparamba, 20 kilometers from Kannur city, this station was started by Sir Charles Alfred Barber at the behest of the erstwhile Madras Government, based on the recommendation of the Famine Commission of 1880 of Government of India.

Hanging Bridge (Thookku Palam) – Peralassery

The hanging bridge of Peralassery is a notable tourist attraction. This is one of the few hanging bridges in Kannur district.

Kanjirakolly Waterfalls, Payyavoor

There is a viewing point  from the falls at Sasippara.

Other Attractions
 Sadhoo Merry Kingdom is a popular water theme park/tourist attraction in Kannur.
 St. Angelo Fort was built in 1505 by the first Portuguese Viceroy of India, Dom Francisco de Almeida. In 1663, the Dutch captured it and then in 1772, they sold the fort to the Arakkal King. In 1790, the British captured it, and it was under the British until 1947.
 Payyambalam Beach is a Kannur beach with an unbroken coastline of a few kilometres. From the beach, one can see ships in transit along the Malabar Coast, from beyond Kozhikode moving towards Mangalore, Goa and Bombay (Mumbai). It contains a well laid out garden and the massive landscaped sculpture of mother and child erected by noted sculptor Kanayi Kunhiraman. But it now lies vandalized by miscreants. 
 Muzhappilangad Drive-in Beach (4 km length) is in the state of Kerala in southwestern India. It is parallel to National Highway 66 (formerly National Highway 17) between Kannur and Thalassery.
 Arakkal Museum, in Ayikkara, is a museum dedicated to the Arakkal family, the only Muslim royal family in Kerala, South India. The museum is a section of the Arakkalkettu (Arakkal Palace). The Durbar Hall section of the palace has been converted into a museum by the Government of Kerala. It was opened in  after a massive renovation and is managed by the Arakkal Family Trust.
 MGS Kalari Sangam is a martial arts and massage training academy founded in 1934.
 The Kannur Lighthouse near the Sea View Park is another place of interest. The first lighthouse at Kannur was built in 1843 by the British at St. Angelo Fort. Over the years, the lighthouse was renovated. In 1948, it was moved to its current location. The lighthouse is still in use.
 The Kannur Cantonment is one of the 62 cantonments in the country and the only one in Kerala. It was established by the British in the 19th century and is still an important location for Indian armed forces.
 Mele Chovva, which is situated 3 km south of Kannur in Kannur-Tellichery road, is an entry junction to Kannur town. Kannur Airport road starts from here.
 Puthiyatheru, which is between Kannur-Taliparamba road, is one of the busiest streets in Kannur; it consist of three roads to Kattampalli and Panakavu and Chirakkal.
 Palakkayam thattu
 The Defence Security Corps (DSC) Centre and DSC Records are located in Kannur town, on the road to Payyambalam Beach. The area is a part of the Kannur Cantonment and is maintained by the Cantonment Board. The DSC centre at Kannur is the mother depot to all platoons in the country.
 Baby Beach is so called because it is smaller than its larger neighbour, Payyambalam Beach. St. Angelo Fort is adjacent to it. The baby beach is part of the Kannur Cantonment and access may be restricted at times.
 Meenkunnu Beach is at Azhikode, just a few kilometres from the town.
 Mapila Bay in Ayikkara, near St. Angelo fort, is a major fishing harbor overlooking the Laccadive Sea.
 The Azhikkal Ferry operates near Azhikode, about 10 km from Kannur town, where the Valapattanam river joins the Laccadive Sea. There is a granite pathway here which stretches 2 km into the sea. Frequent passenger boats are available to Mattool, Parassinikkadavu and Valapattanam from here.
 The Fort road is the one of the busiest roads in Kannur. There are many malls and shopping streets there. The Kannur City Center is a prominent shopping center on Fort Road.
 Sea View Park, near Payyambalam Beach, is overlooked by the Government Guest House.
 Kannur Central Bus Terminal is Kerala's biggest bus terminal. At Thavakkara, it is India's first bus terminal to be developed on a build-operate-transfer (BOT) basis.
Kannur indoor stadium at Mundayad, 6 km from Kannur town is the largest indoor stadium in south India.
 Thottada Beach is a beach in Kannur district. It is about 2.5 km from the  connecting Kannur town and Thalassery.
 Muzhappilanghad driving beach is in Kannur and it is the largest driving beach in Asia.
 Parassinikkadavu snake park is a snake farm dedicated for the preservation and conservation of snakes is in Kannur.
 Aralam wildlife sanctuary is known for elephant, sloth bear, mouse deer etc.
 Elapeedika is a village in the southwestern state of Kerala, India. Elapeedika is around 1000 m above sea level, in the Western Ghats range and is a hill station. There were a lot of cardamom plantations in the olden times. Pazhassiraja's force and East India Company had fought a battle in the 18th century at the Periya pass in Elapeedika. Elapeedika is on the Iritty Taluk in Kannur District and is the highest place in the district. The nearest major railway stations are at Tellicherry and Kannur (approximately 50 km by road). The nearest airport is Kannur International Airport, which is 20 kilometres away.
 Paithalmala, a hillstation bordering Kodagu (Karnataka) in Alakode Panchayat, is in Kannur.
 Thabore is a nearby hill station.
 The Mangrove Trail of Malabar is a day trippers visiting place about 45 km from Kannur. It is a coastal jungle trail offering hiking, birding & boating. 
 Kannur International Airport is an upcoming international facility in Mattanur in Kannur District, Kerala, India. It is the fourth and largest international airport in Kerala.
Palakkayamthattu is a hill station which attracts many tourists. It is famous for sight seeing, rides and a lot more.

Temples 
  
The place got the name as the Land of Krishna because of the Kadalai Shri Krishnaswami Temple, Shri Rajarajeshwaram, Parassinikadavu Sree Muthappan Temple and Annapurneshwari Temple and Madayikavu, the famed temples of the region.

Other temples:
Kottiyoor Vadakkeshwaram Temple
Kalarivathukkal Bhagavathy Temple
Tiruvarkadu Bhagavathy Temple (a.k.a. Madayi Kavu)
Andalurkavu, in Dharmadom
Sree Mahadeva Temple Mudappathur (Vaidyanatha)
Payyanur Subrahmanyaswamy Temple
Kanhirangad Vaidyanatha Temple
Peralassery Subrahmanya swamy Temple
Ramanthali Sankaranarayana Temple
Thayyil Sree Venkataramana Temple
Thalap Sundareswara Temple
Trichambaram Sree Krishnaswamy Temple
Kandamthalli Sreekrishna Temple
Mazhoor Sree Balabhadra swamy temple
Koyyam Sree Maha Vishnu Temple
Kadalayi Sreekrishna Temple
Mattanur Mahadeva Temple
Thiruvangad Sriramaswamy Temple
Kannadiparamba Dharmasastha Temple
Velam Ganapathi Kshetram Temple
Ezhome Sree Trikkool Shiva Temple
Karippal Nagam Perumbadave
Melechovva shiva temple
Vadeswaram Sree Mahashiva Temple, Aroli
Sree Lakshmi Narasimha Swami Temple - Puravoor

Mosques 
Madayi Palli, Madayi
Odatthil Palli, Thalassery

Churches
St. Mary's Forane Church and Mariyan Pilgrim center Taliparamba :
From the beginning of 1960’s, Syrian Catholics from various places began to settle at Taliparamba for various purpose like education, employment and mercantile. At that time they went to Thrichabaran St Paul’s Church and Pushpagiri CMI Church for their religious purposes. On Dec 25 1990, St Mary’s Parish took birth under the Tellicherry Archdiocese. Their dream came true when the foundation stone for the church laid on 2008 August 15. On April 14 2012 the church was opened for the believers by the function presided by Rev: Mar George Valyamattam Metropolitan. On 2013 March 17 he declared the church as a Forane Church and a pilgrim centre.

References

Tourist attractions in Kannur district